14 teams participated in the 1992–93 Egyptian Premier League season. The first team in the league was the champion, and qualified to the African Cup of Champions Clubs.
Zamalek managed to win the league for the 8th time in the club's history.

League table

Top goalscorers

Teams

References

1992–93 in African association football leagues
0
Premier